This page provides supplementary chemical data on chloromethane.

Safety data sheet  

The handling of this chemical may incur notable safety precautions. It is highly recommended that you seek the safety data sheet for this chemical from a reliable source  such as SIRI, and follow its directions. SDS for chloromethane is available at Supelco Inc

Structure and properties

Thermodynamic properties

Vapor pressure of liquid

Table data obtained from CRC Handbook of Chemistry and Physics 44th ed.

Spectral data

References

 

Chemical data pages
Chemical data pages cleanup